Rhodri Molwynog ("Rhodri the Bald and Grey"; died ), also known as Rhodri ap Idwal ("Rhodri son of Idwal") was an 8th-century king of Gwynedd. He was listed as a King of the Britons by the Annals of Wales.

This era in the history of Gwynedd is very obscure and, given the lack of reliable information available, several serious histories of medieval Walesincluding John Davies'sdo not mention Rhodri at all, while othersincluding John Lloyd'smention him only in passing, quoting the undated entry of the Annals of Wales recording his death. Phillimore's reconstruction places the entry in the year 754. The Annals do not mention the death of an earlier king within a reasonable time frame, so the date that he became king is not known, nor is the name of his predecessor.

Rhodri's name also appears in genealogies such as those in Jesus College MS. 20 (where he is described as the son of Idwal Iwrch son of Cadwaladr Fendigiad) and the Harleian genealogies (where he is described as the son of Tutgual son of Cadwaladr). It remains, however, unclear to what extent the genealogies at that point were recording the lineage of the Cuneddion dynasty regardless of their rule or recording the rulers regardless of their connection to the main branch of the dynasty.

The Annals of Wales mention a war in Cornwall around 722 without giving the names of the individuals involved. The Brut y Saeson says that in 721 there was "an extensive war between Rhodri Molwynawg and the Saxons in Cornwall". The Brut Aberpergwm also recorded this event but, while it was accepted for a time by the editors of the Myvyrian Archaiology, Thomas Stephens has since shown that it was one of Iolo Morganwg's many forgeries.

The Rotri appearing in the Annals has sometimes been misidentified as a ruler of Alt Clut (modern Dumbarton Rock), the Brythonic kingdom later known as Strathclyde.

He was succeeded by his son, Cynan Dindaethwy.

See also
 Kings of Gwynedd
 Kings of Wales family trees

References 

 

Year of birth unknown
750s deaths
Year of death uncertain
Monarchs of Gwynedd
8th-century Welsh monarchs